Fitz is the surname of:

 Ann Fitz (born 1977), American attorney
 Brent Fitz (born 1970), Canadian-American musician
 Hendrikje Fitz (1961–2016), German actress
 Henry Fitz (1808–1863), American telescope manufacturer
 Joseph Fitz (1886–1945), American Medal of Honor recipient
 Josef-August Fitz (1911–1977), highly decorated German World War II officer
 Reginald Heber Fitz (1843–1913), American physician
 Veronika Fitz (1936–2020), German television actress
 Willy Fitz (1918–1993), Austrian footballer and coach

See also
 
 Fitz (patronymic)
 Fitz (given name)
 Eva-Maria Fitze (born 1982), German figure skater